The Allegany County Fairgrounds is located just west of Cumberland, Maryland along McMullen Highway. Throughout the year the fairground holds musical concerts, car races, and private events. Once annually the Allegany County fair is held on the grounds, called the Allegany County Fair and AgExpo. As of 2006, the annual fair is an 8-day event customarily in the middle of July. Another major event is DelFest, a 4-day bluegrass festival originated by Del McCoury, and held annually since 2008 over the Memorial Day weekend. 

Neither of the above events were held in 2020.

External links 
 Official Site

Buildings and structures in Cumberland, Maryland
Annual fairs
July events
Fairgrounds in the United States
Tourist attractions in Allegany County, Maryland